A.E.P. Olympias Patras (Greek: Α.Ε.Π. Ολυμπιάς Πάτρα) or Olympiadas Patras (Greek: Ολυμπιάδα Πάτρα), is a Greek multi-sport club that is located in Patras. It was founded in 1961. A.E.P. Olympias is one of the most historic athletic unions in Patras.  The athletic union's team colors are orange and white.  The club's current president is Nikolaos Bogonikolos.

History 
The athletic union was founded in 1961, in a tavern that was owned by Birba, at Messolongiou and Fotila Streets.  The first sporting club departments of the parent athletic association included: track and field, basketball, volleyball, and cycling.  The club's first board of directors meeting was held on December 26, 1961, and the club's first general assembly meeting took place on April 15, 1962.

Departments 
Olympias Patras B.C. - men's basketball
Olympias Patras V.C. - men's volleyball
Olympias Patras Women's Basketball
Olympias Patras Women's Volleyball
Olympias Patras Junior Volleyball
Olympias Patras Track and Field
Olympias Patras Bicycling
Olympias Patras Tennis

Men's basketball 
The basketball team, Olympias Patras B.C., participated in the Greek A2 League from 1977 until 1981.  They competed in the top Greek League in the 2006-07 season and the 2007-08 season.  They also participated in the FIBA EuroCup during the 2007-08 season.

Women's basketball 
The women's basketball team has competed in the Greek B League since the 1989–90 season.

Men's volleyball 
One of the most historic sports departments of the club is the men's volleyball club, which participated in the Greek Volleyball First Division in 1965–66, 1969–70, 2000–01, and 2001–02.  From 1981 to 1983, the men's volleyball club played in the Greek Volleyball Second Division, and in 1987, it played in the Greek Volleyball Third Division.

Women's volleyball 
The women's volleyball section has made numerous appearances in the national categories and has also competed in the Greek Volleyball A2 Division.

Junior volleyball 
The junior volleyball section finished in second place in the Junior Volleyball National Championships that were held in Athens in 2006.

Track and field 
The biggest achievement of the track and field department was a second-place finish in the Panhellenic climax, after Panellinios GS.  That track team featured many athletes from Greece, and it entered into many local championships in all of their categories.  The most famous athlete of the department was Nikos Angelopoulos, who achieved victory in the Balkan Track And Field Games in Sofia, in 1980, in the men's 200m with a record time of 20.71.

Bicycling 
The club's cycling department no longer exists today.

Tennis 
Olympias' tennis club plays in its closed arena in the neighborhood of Taraboura in a 2,500-seat arena, which was constructed in 2001.  Before that, it played in an open field in the neighborhood of Prosfygika.  The arena is located at 24 Tisonas Street.  Its postal code is 26223.

Titles

Men's basketball 
Greek A2 League Champion: (2006)
Greek B League Champion: (2003)
4x Achaea Champion: (1965, 1967, 1968, 1998)

Women's basketball 
2x Achaea Champion: (1994, 1999)

Men's volleyball 
Greek Regional Champion: (1970)
Achaea Champion: (1970)

Women's volleyball 
Greek B League Champion: (1997)
Achaea Champion: (1970)

External links 
A.E.P. Olympias - Official Website
Η Olympiada Patras στο www.localbasket.gr

Sports clubs established in 1961
Sport in Patras
Multi-sport clubs in Greece

el:Α.Ε.Π. Ολυμπιάς